Jiangxi Gaoan High School (高安中学) is a senior high school in Gao'an, Jiangxi, China. It was founded in 1907. There are 10,800 students.

References

External links
Gaoan High School

High schools in Jiangxi